A variety of units of measurement were used in the various independent Italian states and Italian dependencies of foreign empires up to the unification of Italy in the 19th century. The units to measure length, volume, mass, etc., could differ widely between countries or between towns in a country (e.g. Rome and Ancona), but usually not between a country and its capital.

The Kingdom of Sardinia included the island of Sardinia and the continental areas of Piedmont (with the capital Turin) and Liguria (with Genoa). The Kingdom of Naples included the island of Sicily (with Palermo). The Kingdom of Lombardy–Venetia was part of the Austrian Empire, which also shared ruling family with Modena, Parma and Tuscany (capital Florence). The Papal States included the areas of Latium (with the capital Rome), Umbria, Romagna (with Bologna) and the Marches (with Ancona).

Milan adopted the metric system in 1803, during the Napoleonic wars, albeit reusing names of older units. After the Congress of Vienna, the various Italian states reverted to their original systems of measurements.

In 1845 Sardinia passed legislation to introduce the metric system within five years. In 1859 Lombardy (but not Venetia) was annexed. In 1860 Parma, Modena, Tuscany, Umbria, Romagna and the Marches, and the Two Sicilies (Naples) were assimilated into Sardinia and under the Law 132 of 28 July 28, 1861 the metric system became the official system of measurement throughout the (this year) Italian kingdom. The last to be incorporated were Venetia (1866), and the rest of the Papal States (1870).

For historical Roman measurements see Ancient Roman units of measurement. The following is a list of units before the adoption of the metric system as well as local names for metric-based units.

Over time many unit names were reused for metric units, adding an unnecessary obstacle to the system change. These units are marked with €. They are also placed after the traditional.

Length

Units varied from one province or city to another. In the north the atomo was the smallest unit.

Dedicated use:  # architect's   † commercial   ‡ mercer's

Mass

One libbra (pound) differed between 307 and 398 g.
Several countries used both a light and a heavy pound.

Dedicated use:  # gold   ∆ silver   § jewels   † apothecaries'   ‡ silk   @ spices, drugs and pigments   ¥ commercial   ¢ oil     ship cargoes: Σ grain    flour etc   § salt

Area

Dedicated use:  # architect's

Volume (dry)

Dry and wet capacity (volume) were usually two separate systems, but a few units were universally handled, mostly in countries that had had experience with the metric system. (One of the sources do not state what subsystem they are handling).

Dedicated use:  # firewood   † grain   ‡ salt   ∆ oats and legumes   Σ coal

Volume (liquids)
There are also a unit cantara: no specifics.

Dedicated use:  # wine   † spirits   ‡ oil

Notes

References

Italian culture
Italy